Stag Lane Aerodrome was a private aerodrome between 1915 and 1933 in Edgware, north London, UK.

History
The land for an aerodrome was purchased by the London & Provincial Aviation Company (Warren and Smiles - Michael Geoffrey Smiles of Bonnington died in 1921) in October 1915. The company used the aerodrome for flying training during the First World War. London & Provincial ceased flying in July 1919 after a dispute with Department of Civil Aviation (see United Kingdom Civil Aviation Authority), which refused them a licence.

Stag Lane became the main base of The de Havilland Aircraft Company Limited in 1920 and they purchased the freehold in 1922. Former wartime aircraft were refurbished in the early years, and the company designed and built large numbers of aircraft at Stag Lane in the 1920s and early 1930s. In 1934 the company moved to a larger factory and airfield at Hatfield Aerodrome, Hatfield, Hertfordshire.

Stag Lane Aerodrome was sold for housing development in 1933, though a small  site was retained as a factory and offices for the de Havilland Engine Company Limited. The last flight from the airfield was by a de Havilland DH.87 Hornet Moth, G -ACTA in July 1934, by which time the company factory had been relocated to Hatfield, Hertfordshire.

British Telecom
In 1976 the GPO (later British Telecom) opened the world's largest international exchange on the site, due to the hold ups in the construction of their new Mondial House, with the "De Havilland" Plessey TXK2 and "Mollison" Ericsson TXK5. The exchange closed in 1988, as most of the analogue technology was out of date.

Aircraft built at Stag Lane
Cierva C.24 Autogiro
de Havilland DH.34
de Havilland DH.50
de Havilland DH.51
de Havilland DH.53 Humming Bird
de Havilland DH.60 Moth/Gipsy Moth
de Havilland DH.61 Giant Moth
de Havilland DH.65 Hound
de Havilland DH.66 Hercules
de Havilland DH.71 Tiger Moth
de Havilland DH.75 Hawk Moth
de Havilland DH.80 Puss Moth
de Havilland DH.82 Tiger Moth
de Havilland DH.83 Fox Moth
de Havilland DH.84 Dragon
de Havilland DH.85 Leopard Moth
de Havilland DH.86 Express
de Havilland DH.87a Hornet Moth

References

Airports established in 1915
Aircraft industry in London
Airports in the London region
British Telecom buildings and structures
De Havilland
Defunct airports in England
Edgware
History of Middlesex
International telecommunications
Telephone exchange buildings
1915 establishments in England